Janney Marín "Chiquis" Rivera  (born June 26, 1985) is an American singer and television personality. She is the eldest daughter of singer Jenni Rivera.
She began her singing career in early 2014, releasing her first single "Paloma Blanca" as a tribute to her mother. At Premios Juventud, she made her musical debut on international television with her performance of "Esa No Soy Yo".

She made her television debut with her reality show Jenni Rivera Presents: Chiquis & Raq-C and also appeared on her mother's hit spin-off reality show I Love Jenni. Rivera's debut album, Ahora, was released on June 2, 2015. On April 7, 2015 she released her memoir titled Forgiveness, and a second on February 2, 2022 titled Unstoppable.

Rivera is the recipient of two Latin Grammy Awards, two Lo Nuestro Awards, and a Grammy nomination. Life 
Janney Marín Rivera was born and raised in California. She is daughter of  Regional Mexican star, Jenni Rivera and her first husband, José Trinidad Marín. She is the first child of both her parents, has one younger sister, Jacquelin, one brother, Mikey, and two half-siblings from her mother's second marriage. Rivera is Presbyterian and attends church regularly with her family.

 Relationship with mother 
On April 7, 2015 she released a memoir called Forgiveness, she revealed the reasons she and her mother, Jenni Rivera, stopped speaking in October 2012. She revealed that she was molested by a woman. She confirmed that the reason for her and her mother's separation stemmed from the rumor that she had an affair with Esteban Loaiza. She denied the rumor and attributes it to "toxic voices" that surrounded her mother at a time when she was deeply lonely and confused, leading her to doubt her then-husband's fidelity and her own daughter's loyalty. She stated, in an attempt to find evidence of incriminating behavior, that Rivera looked at video footage from her home's security system and found an instance in which Chiquis is seen leaving the master bedroom which Rivera shared with Loaiza while they were married. Chiquis said that Rivera became fixated with the video, and watched it so many times that she had made herself believe her daughter actually "came back to the house and snuck back into the bedroom" to have a sexual encounter with Loaiza. Beto Cuevas, who was friends with Jenni, has stated that he gave her advice on how to deal with the rift with Chiquis three days before Jenni's death.

Sexual abuse
In 1997, her aunt, Rosie Rivera came forward and confessed to Jenni Rivera, that José Trinidad Marín, used to sexually molest her, and was now doing the same to Chiquis. Physical examination showed he had done the same with her younger sister Jacqie Marín. The molestation case was opened in 1997 and Marín spent 9 years as a fugitive before he was apprehended in April 2006 and convicted of sexual assault and rape. In May 2007, José Trinidad Marín was found guilty of 7 out of 9 charges and sentenced to 30 years in prison without parole.

Mother's death

On 9 December 2012, her mother and six others died in a plane crash following a concert at the Monterrey Arena in Monterrey, Nuevo León. The plane was en route to Toluca for an appearance by Rivera on La Voz ... México.Associated Press (December 9, 2012). Jenni Rivera, Mexican-American singer, killed in plane crash in northern Mexico; she was 43 years old. Daily News|location=New York.

Marriage

Chiquis married Lorenzo E. Mendez Ronquillo (former vocalist of la Original Banda El Limón) in June 2019 and became stepmother to Lorenzo's daughter from his previous marriage. On September 17, 2020, Rivera announced her divorce with Méndez through social media, claiming it a decision from both parties. Chiquis would later claim in her 2022 Autobiography Unbreakable that Lorenzo was a drug addict with aggression issues. At one point spitting in her face and grabbing her by the neck, only stopping after her brother charged at him with a dumbbell.

 Career 

 Television personality 

She made her television debut with her reality show Jenni Rivera Presents: Chiquis & Raq-C, Chiquis 'n Control, and also appeared on her mother's hit spin-off reality show I Love Jenni. She also starred in her mini web—series Chiquis Confidential. She and her siblings started in a spin-off of I Love Jenni called The Riveras. The series aired its fourth and final season on NBC Universo on August 11.

 Singer 
Rivera began her singing career in early 2014, releasing her first single "Paloma Blanca". It was written by her and dedicated as a tribute to her late mother. At Premios Juventud she made her musical debut on international television with her performance of "Esa No Soy Yo".

On April 6, 2015, Chiquis declared to the daily newspaper Miami Herald, she would be releasing an album called Ahora, on June 2, 2015. She stated, "I called it Ahora because it's about living in the moment and appreciating the now. I feel that's how my life can be summed up. It really has a little bit of everything – pop mixed with banda. I love all types of music and didn't want to limit myself since I am my own record label [Sweet Sound Records] I was able to take my time with it. I want to give that to people. I don't know anyone who listens to just one type of music – it's universal and brings everyone together."

In Spring of 2018, Rivera released her second studio album titled ‘Entre Botellas’ which feature songs made with Lorenzo Mendez, Jenni Rivera and Juan Rivera. Her two singles ‘Vas a Volver’ and ‘Horas Extras’ where featured in the album as well as ‘Quisieran Tener Mi Lugar’, a duet sang with her mother Jenni Rivera.

 Artistry 

 Musical style 
Rivera's musical style is classified as banda, a form of traditional Mexican music popular in Mexico and parts of the United States with large Mexican populations. Banda music originated in the state of Sinaloa and the music sound is primarily instruments such as tuba, clarinets and trumpets, i.e. Banda El Recodo and Banda La Costeña.

 Discography 
 Ahora (2015)
 Entre Botellas (2018)
 Playlist (2020)
 Abeja Reina (2022)

 Filmography 

Awards and nominations

Billboard Latin Music Awards

The Billboard Latin Music Awards are awarded annually by Billboard magazine in the United States. The Billboard awards are the Latin music industry's longest running and most prestigious award. Chiquis has received two nominations.

|-
|2015
|rowspan="2" scope="row| Herself
| Hot Latin Songs Artist of the Year, Female
| 
|-
|2016
| Regional Mexican Albums Artist of the Year, Solo
| 
|}

Grammy Awards
The Grammy Awards are awarded annually by The Recording Academy. Chiquis has received one nomination.

|-
|2023
| Abeja Reina| Best Regional Mexican Music Album (including Tejano)
| 
|-

Juventud Awards
The Juventud Awards are awarded annually by the television network Univision in the United States. Chiquis has received eight nominations.

|-
|rowspan="3" scope="row| 2014
|rowspan="2" scope="row| Paloma Blanca
| Catchiest Tune
| 
|-
| My Favorite Video
| 
|-
|rowspan="3" scope="row| Herself
| Best Artist using Social Media to Connect with Fans
| 
|-
|rowspan="3" scope="row| 2019
| Best Social Artist
| 
|-
|Best Scroll Stopper
| 
|-
|Chiquis Rivera and Lorenzo Méndez
|Best Couple
| 
|-
|2020
|rowspan="2" scope="row| Herself
| Breaking the Internet
| 
|-
|2021
| Female Youth Artist of the Year
| 

 Latin American Music Awards 
The Latin American Music Awards are the Spanish-language version of the American Music Awards hosted on U.S. Spanish-language television network, Telemundo.

|-
|rowspan="2" scope="row| 2015
|rowspan="3" scope="row| Herself
| New Artist of the Year
| 
|-
| Favorite Female Artist
| 
|-
|2022
|Social Artist of the Year
| 
|}

Latin Grammy Awards
The Latin Grammy Awards are awarded annually by The Latin Recording Academy in the United States. Rivera has received two awards.

|-
|2020
| Playlist| Best Banda Album
| 
|-
|2022
| Abeja Reina| Best Banda Album
| 
|-

Lo Nuestro Awards
The Lo Nuestro Awards are awarded annually by the television network Univision in the United States.

|-
| 2015
|rowspan="6" scope="row| Herself
|rowspan="2" scope="row| Regional Mexican: Female Artist of the Year
| 
|-
| 2016
| 
|-
| 2017
| Female Artist of the Year
| 
|-
|2020
|Social Artist of the Year
| 
|-
|2021
|Regional Mexican Artist of the Year
| 
|-
|rowspan="5" scope="row| 2023
|Female Regional Mexican Artist of the Year
| 
|-
| Abeja Reina
| Regional Mexican Album of the Year
| 
|-
| Mi Problema
| Regional Mexican Song of the Year
| 
|-
| Quiero Amanecer Con Alguien
| Banda Song of the Year
| 
|-
| Baila Así
| Urban Dance/Pop Song of the Year
| 
|}

Premios De La Radio
The Premios De La Radio'' are awarded annually by the television network Estrella TV in the United States for the Regional Mexican Music genre. Chiquis has received one nomination, and in 2014 she lost the award to her late mother Jenni Rivera.

|-
| 2014
|rowspan="3" scope="row| Herself
|rowspan="3" scope="row| Female Artist of the Year
| 
|-
| 2015
|
|-
| 2022
|
|-

Tu Mundo Awards
The Tu Mundo Awards are produced by Telemundo awarded annually from the American Airlines Arena in Miami, Florida.

|-
| 2014
| #BossBee
| Fan Club of the Year
| 
|-

References

1985 births
Living people
American musicians of Mexican descent
American banda musicians
Hispanic and Latino American women singers
Hispanic and Latino American musicians
Jenni Rivera
Musicians from Long Beach, California
Singers from California
Spanish-language singers of the United States
21st-century American singers
21st-century American women singers
Latin Grammy Award winners
Women in Latin music
Universal Music Latin Entertainment artists